Cwm Rhondda is a popular hymn tune written by John Hughes (1873–1932) in 1907. The name is taken from the Welsh name for the Rhondda Valley.

It is usually used in English as a setting for William Williams' text "Guide Me, O Thou Great Redeemer" (or, in some traditions, "Guide Me, O Thou Great Jehovah"), originally  ("Lord, lead me through the wilderness") in Welsh. The tune and hymn are often called "Bread of Heaven" because of a repeated line in this English translation.

In Welsh the tune is most commonly used as a setting for a hymn by Ann Griffiths,  ("Lo, between the myrtles standing"), and it was as a setting of those words that the tune was first published in 1907.

Tune

John Hughes wrote the first version of the tune, which he called "Rhondda", for the Cymanfa Ganu (hymn festival) in Pontypridd in 1905, when the enthusiasm of the 1904–1905 Welsh Revival still remained. The present form was developed for the inauguration of the organ at Capel Rhondda, in Hopkinstown in the Rhondda Valley, in 1907. Hughes himself played the organ at this performance. The name was changed from "Rhondda" to "Cwm Rhondda" by Harry Evans, of Dowlais, to avoid confusion with another tune, by M. O. Jones.

The hymn is usually pitched in A-flat major and has the 8.7.8.7.4.4.7.7 measure which is common in Welsh hymns. The third line repeats the first and the fourth line develops the second. The fifth line normally involves a repeat of the four-syllable text and the sixth reaches a climax on a dominant seventh chord (bar 12) – emphasised by a rising arpeggio in the alto and bass parts. The final line continues the musical development of the second and fourth (and generally carries a repeat of the text of the sixth).
On account of these vigorous characteristics, the tune was resisted for some time in both Welsh and English collections but has long been firmly established.

Hymn text: 'Guide me, O Thou great Redeemer'

Present-day

The following are the English and Welsh versions of the hymn, as given in the standard modern collections.

The Welsh version shown above is a somewhat literal re-translation from the English version back into Welsh. Earlier versions of the hymn book published jointly by the Calvinist and Wesleyan Methodists had a version with five verses (i.e. omitting verse two of the six given in the History section below) that was otherwise much closer to Pantycelyn's original Welsh text.

History
William Williams Pantycelyn (named, in the Welsh style, "Pantycelyn" after the farm which his wife inherited) is generally acknowledged as the greatest Welsh hymnwriter. It comprised six verses. (References to a five verse version in Pantycelyn's Alleluia of 1745 appear to be incorrect.) It was originally titled  (Prayer for strength for the journey through the world's wilderness).

Peter Williams (1722–1796) translated part of the hymn into the English version given above, with the title Prayer for Strength. It was published in Hymns on various subjects, 1771. This translation is the only Welsh hymn to have gained widespread circulation in the English-speaking world. The present-day Welsh version, given above, is essentially a redaction of the original to parallel Peter Williams's English version. A result of the translation process is that the now-familiar phrase "Bread of heaven" does not actually occur in the original; it is a paraphrase of the references to manna.

The Welsh word  corresponds more-or-less to the English Lord, in all its senses. It appears in the Old Testament to translate Hebrew words which are a paraphrase of the Divine Name (the tetragrammaton), and in the New Testament to translate , the standard honorific for Jesus Christ. Accordingly, Peter Williams translated it as Jehovah in accord with the practice of his time. Many English-language hymnals today translate it as "Redeemer".

The following version of the original is taken from Gwaith Pantycelyn (The Works of Pantycelyn). All but the second verse is given, with minor variations, in the Welsh Hymnbook of the Calvinist and Wesleyan Methodists, published by the assemblies of the two churches. (The variations are mainly to update the language, e.g. in verse 1  (elided to ), meaning "in [me]", has become  in more modern Welsh.)

Meanings
The hymn describes the experience of God's people in their travel through the wilderness from the escape from slavery in Egypt (Exodus 12–14), being guided by a cloud by day and a fire by night (Exodus 13:17–22) to their final arrival forty years later in the land of Canaan (Joshua 3). During this time their needs were supplied by God, including the daily supply of manna (Exodus 16).

The hymn text forms an allegory for the journey of a Christian throughout their life on earth requiring the Redeemer's guidance and ending at the gates of Heaven (the verge of Jordan) and end of time (death of death and hell's destruction).

Instances of use
The hymn has been sung on various British state occasions, such as the funerals of Diana, Princess of Wales and Queen Elizabeth The Queen Mother, and the weddings of Prince William and Catherine Middleton, Prince Harry and Meghan Markle and Service of reflection for Queen Elizabeth II in Wales at 2022.

The hymn is also featured prominently in the soundtrack to the 1941 film How Green Was My Valley, directed by John Ford. The soundtrack, by Alfred Newman, won that year's Academy Award for Original Music Score. It is also featured at the beginning of The African Queen (film), with Katharine Hepburn singing and playing the organ. Only Men Aloud! also sang an arrangement by Tim Rhys-Evans and Jeffrey Howard on the BBC 1 Show Last Choir Standing in 2008. They subsequently released it on their self-titled début album.

The hymn was the informal anthem of Wales in the "Green and Pleasant Land" section of the 2012 Summer Olympics opening ceremony.

The BBC sitcom One Foot in the Grave used this song on the episode "The Beast In The Cage". The lyrics were altered to be about the main character Victor Meldrew.

Hymn text: 

Other English hymn texts

Some hymnals use this tune for the hymn "God of Grace and God of Glory" written by Harry Emerson Fosdick in 1930.

Others for "Full salvation! Full salvation! Lo, the fountain opened wide" by Francis Bottome (1823–94).

Legacy
In 2007 dignitaries from Pontypridd Town Council unveiled a plaque at Capel Rhondda in Hopkinstown, Pontypridd, to celebrate the centenary of the hymn's composition. Minister Rev Phil Rickards said: "This is where the tune was first publicly performed." A service celebrating the centenary was also held at John Hughes' burial place, Salem Baptist Chapel in nearby Tonteg.

Rugby
Apart from church use, probably its best known use is as the 'Welsh Rugby Hymn', often sung by the crowd at rugby matches, especially those of the Wales national rugby union team. There it is common for many voices to repeat of the last three syllables of the penultimate line of each verse ("want no more", "strength and shield" and "give to thee") to a rising arpeggio, which in church use is only sung in the alto and bass parts if at all.

Football
From the second half of the 20th century, English and Scottish football fans used often to sing a song based on this tune using the words "We'll support you evermore", which in turn led to many different versions being adapted. , the variation "You're Not Singing Any More" when taunting the fans of opposing teams who are losing remains extremely popular.

Notes

References

External links
 Free typeset sheet music for SATB (voice), from Cantorion.org
Free score at the Mutopia Project
"Guide Me, O Thou Great Redeemer" sung by the Westminster Abbey Choir and the Choristers of the Chapel Royal

Hymn tunes
Welsh patriotic songs